Zdravko Milutinović (born 29 March 1951) is a Yugoslav former sports shooter. He competed at the 1972, 1976 and the 1980 Summer Olympics.

References

1951 births
Living people
Yugoslav male sport shooters
Olympic shooters of Yugoslavia
Shooters at the 1972 Summer Olympics
Shooters at the 1976 Summer Olympics
Shooters at the 1980 Summer Olympics
Place of birth missing (living people)